Brownsville Commercial Historic District is a national historic district located adjacent to the Brownsville Northside Historic District at Brownsville, Fayette County, Pennsylvania. The district includes 55 contributing buildings and two contributing structures in the central business district of Brownsville. Most of the contributing buildings are three and four-story brick commercial buildings built between 1900 and 1930, with four buildings dated to the 19th century. The oldest building is the Flatiron Building (c. 1835). Other notable buildings include the International Order of Odd Fellows Building (1876), Monongahela National Bank (1902), Second National Bank (1916), Snowdon Building (1907), Union Station (1928), Crawford Building (1908), and Borough Building (1940).  The contributing structures are the separately listed Dunlap's Creek Bridge and a stone railroad tunnel (1903).

It was added to the National Register of Historic Places in 1993.

References

External links

Historic districts in Fayette County, Pennsylvania
Historic districts on the National Register of Historic Places in Pennsylvania
National Register of Historic Places in Fayette County, Pennsylvania